Clinical Anatomy is a peer-reviewed medical journal that covers anatomy in all its aspects—gross, histologic, developmental, and neurologic—as applied to medical practice. It is the official publication of the American Association of Clinical Anatomists, the British Association of Clinical Anatomists, the Australian and New Zealand Association of Clinical Anatomists, and the Anatomical Society of Southern Africa.

According to the Journal Citation Reports, the journal has a 2020 impact factor of 2.414.

References

External links 
 
 Australian and New Zealand Association of Clinical Anatomists
 Anatomical Society of Southern Africa

Wiley-Liss academic journals
Publications established in 1988
English-language journals
Anatomy journals
8 times per year journals